Rampsgill Head is a fell in the English Lake District, standing to the west of Haweswater Reservoir in the Far Eastern Fells. It forms the focal point of three ridges which fan out north-east, north-west and south.

Topography
The spine of the Far Eastern Fells, travelling north from High Street, crosses the Straits of Riggindale and then collides head-on with the steep U-shaped valley of Rampsgill which comes south to meet it. The ridge splits in two, sending one arm around each side of Rampsgill and the Martindale valley system of which this forms part. The north-western branch leads over the fells of The Knott and Rest Dodd, finally reaching Place Fell above the head of Ullswater. The north-eastern branch continues the main ridge of the Far Eastern Fells, running over High Raise and ending near the foot of Ullswater at Heughescar Hill. Between these two embracing arms are the valleys of Boredale, Bannerdale, Rampsgill and Fusedale, collectively known as Martindale.

Rampsgill Head stands at the junction of these three ridges, with the summit a little to the north-east. Kidsty Pike, a subsidiary top to the east, is given separate fell status by Wainwright in his Pictorial Guide to the Lakeland Fells and that convention is followed here. Rampsgill Head therefore occupies a very small area for one of the higher fells.

The southern ridge to High Street is the narrowest, closing down to little more than the width of the path at the Straits of Riggindale. The north-eastern ridge is also narrow, once Kidsty Pike is passed, but the north-western ridge is much broader with the summit of The Knott standing off to the left.

The northern face of the fell drops 1,800 ft over rough ground into the bowl of upper Rampsgill. The south-western flank above Hayeswater and the south-eastern above Riggindale (a feeder of Haweswater) are craggier, none of them giving a realistic route of ascent for the average walker.

Ascents
High Street (the Roman road) crosses the fell to the south-east of the summit, passing along the ridge from High Street to High Raise. There is also a clear path along the third ridge to The Knott.

Summit
The top is grassy with a little outcropped rock, a cairn marking the top. A larger cairn is set on the brink of the north face. The view westward to the Helvellyns is good with Ullswater and Brothers Water also visible. Ascents can be made via other fells from Patterdale, Hartsop and Mardale Head.

References

Fells of the Lake District
Hewitts of England
Nuttalls